AC Bobigny 93 Rugby is a rugby union team from Île-de-France which plays in Fédérale 1 (D3). The club is based in Bobigny, Seine-Saint-Denis.

The rugby union section was created in 1965 as part of the sports club. The independent association, AC Bobigny 93 Rugby, was created in 2005. It is based in Île-de-France.

The club also has a women's section.

History 

 1965 : Creation of the club. Plays in the FSGT championship (Fédération Sportive et Gymnique du Travail).
 1969 : Joins the Fédération française de rugby (FFR).
 1970-1978 : The first years in FFR with two promotions.
 1978 : Final of the French second division championship, beat Tuchan (Aude) to be promoted to the first division.
 1979 : Promotion with honour.
 1986-1987 : Promoted to 3rd division.
 1989-1990 : Promoted to 2nd division.
 1990-2002 : Twelve years in 2nd division leads to Fédérale 2
 2001-2002 : Champions of France in Fédérale 2 and promotion to Fédérale 1
 2006-2007 : Finalist in Fédérale 1 (play-down) (defeat against RC Châteaurenard 24-25)

Famous players 

 Jean-Pierre Bordessoules
 Jacky Courrent
 Valentin Courrent
 Jacky Dany
 Alain Chamois
 Yves Donguy
 Jean-Claude Kaninda

List of coaches 

 Jean-Pierre Bordessoules
 Francis Auburgan 1979
 Frédéric Barthe
 Benoît Larousse

External links 
 Official site
 itsrugby.com 

Bobigny
Sport in Seine-Saint-Denis